Sabarimala stampede is a human crowd crush that occurred at Sabarimala temple in the Indian state of Kerala in 1999. On 14 January 1999, (the Makara Jyothi Day), 53 people, the majority of them from outside Kerala, died in the crowd crush at the Pamba base camp caused by, among other things, the collapse of the sides of a hillock.

Justice Chandrasekhara Menon Committee
A Judicial commission headed by Justice Chandrasekhara Menon, was constituted to investigate the tragedy. Justice Chandrasekhara Menon, in his report found the State Government guilty of "negligence in ensuring the safety of the pilgrims coming from different parts of the country". The report pointed out the need to provide basic amenities on the Pullumedu route through which a large number of pilgrims from Tamil Nadu travel. Since over 60% of devotees coming to Sabarimala during the pilgrimage season are from other states and this route provides them easy access to temple towns like Madurai on their return journey, the report said. Most of the proposals of the committee were not enacted and led to huge public outcry after 2011 Sabarimala stampede.

See also
 2011 Sabarimala stampede

References

External links
 Sabarimala stampede kills over 100; scores injured G Ananthakrishnan, 14 Jan 2011 The Times of India

Human stampedes in India
Sabarimala Stampede, 1999
History of Kerala (1947–present)
Human stampedes in 1999
Disasters in Kerala
History of Pathanamthitta district